Cressa is a comune (municipality) in the Province of Novara in the Italian region Piedmont, located about  northeast of Turin and about  northwest of Novara.

Cressa borders the following municipalities: Bogogno, Borgomanero, Fontaneto d'Agogna, and Suno.

References

Cities and towns in Piedmont